Meyasaurus is an extinct genus of Teiid lizard known from the Barremian of Spain and the Isle of Wight, UK. Four species are known from Spain, from the La Huérguina, Camarillas, and La Pedrera de Rúbies Formations while an indeterminate taxon is known from the Wessex Formation of Isle of Wight. It is a possible close relative of Barbatteius and other members of Barbatteiidae.

References 

Cretaceous lizards
Barremian life
Cretaceous Spain
Fossils of Spain
Camarillas Formation
La Huérguina Formation
Fossil taxa described in 1915